The 2020 Luxembourg T20I Trophy was a Twenty20 International (T20I) cricket tournament that was played in Luxembourg from 28 to 30 August 2020. The participating teams were the hosts Luxembourg, along with Belgium and Czech Republic. The matches were played at the Pierre Werner Cricket Ground in Walferdange. These were the first official T20I matches to be played in Luxembourg since the International Cricket Council announced that all matches played between Associate Members from 1 January 2019 would be eligible for T20I status. The series was organised to provide players with some international cricket after the postponement of the 2019 T20 World Cup Europe Qualifier. Belgium won the series with a game to spare, ending with a perfect record of four victories.

Squads

Points table

Fixtures

References

External links
 Series home at ESPN Cricinfo

Associate international cricket competitions in 2020